The 2000 Scottish Claymores season was the sixth season for the team in the NFL Europe League (NFLEL). The Claymores were led by sixth-year head coach Jim Criner and played their home games at the Murrayfield Stadium in Edinburgh (three) and the Hampden Park in Glasgow (two). Scotland finished the regular season in second place with a record of 6–4, qualifying for the league final for the second time in team history. The Claymores lost 10–13 to the Rhein Fire in World Bowl 2000.

Personnel

Staff

Roster

Schedule

Standings

Game summaries

World Bowl 2000

Notes

References

Scotland
Scottish Claymores seasons